NA-31 Peshawar-IV is a constituency for the National Assembly of Pakistan.

Area
During the delimitation of 2018, NA-31 (Peshawar-IV) acquired areas from three former constituencies namely NA-1 (Peshawar-I), NA-2 (Peshawar-II), and NA-3 (Peshawar-III) with most areas coming from NA-2 (Peshawar-II), the areas of Peshawar which are part of this constituency are listed below alongside the former constituency name from which they were acquired:

Areas acquired from NA-1 (Peshawar-I)
Bhana Mari

Areas acquired from NA-2 (Peshawar-II)
Ziarat Wali Muhammad Sahib
Gulberg
Kotla Mohsin Khan
Landi Arbab
Nodeh Payan
Peshawar University
Police Colony
Hayatabad
Census Charge No. 17 (excluding Darmagi, Irrigation Colony Warsak Road, Census Circle No. 3, and Census Circle No. 6)
Peshawar University Town Committee
Peshawar Cantonment
Reggi Lalma

Areas acquired from NA-3 Peshawar-III
Reggi Ufatazai

Members of Parliament

1970–1977: NW-2 Peshawar-II

1977–2002: NA-2 Peshawar-II

2002–2018: NA-2 Peshawar-II

2018-2022: NA-30 Peshawar-IV

1985 general election
The 1985 General Election was held as a non-party based election. Seleem Khan Khalil won this election.

2002 general election

  |style="background-color: red" |
   |PAT
   |Khalid Ayub
   |1,575
   |2.81
   |N/A
|-
  |style="background-color: purple" |
   |QWP
   |Abdul Manan Akhunzada Advocate
   |926
   |1.66
   |N/A
|-

 

A total of 1,367 votes were rejected.

2008 general election

A total of 2,003 votes were rejected.

2013 general election

The 2013 General Election was held on May 11, 2013, and Engineer Hamid Ul Haq standing for PTI succeeded to the National Assembly after winning 79,125 votes. Ul Haq beat former Federal Minister for Communication  Arbab Alamgir Khan of the PPPP.

A total of 2,408 votes were rejected.

2018 general election 

General elections were held on 25 July 2018.

By-election 2023 
A by-election will be held on 19 March 2023 due to the resignation of Sher Ali Arbab, the previous MNA from this seat.

See also
NA-30 Peshawar-III
NA-32 Peshawar-V

References 

External links
 Election result's official website
 Election result 2018

30
30